Le Somail is a hamlet in the Aude department of southwestern France. Le Somail is located along the Canal du Midi. Its territory is shared by 3 communes: Ginestas, Saint-Nazaire-d'Aude and Sallèles-d'Aude.

History
In the 17th century, the town was the resting place for passengers on the mail barge operating between Toulouse and Agde.

References

External links

 Official website 

Villages in Occitania (administrative region)